The Sri Lanka sabretail, (Megalogomphus ceylonicus) is a species of dragonfly in the family Gomphidae. It is endemic to Sri Lanka.

See also 
 List of odonates of Sri Lanka

References

 ceylonicus.html World Dragonflies
 Animal diversity web
 Query Results

Gomphidae